is a 1978 Japanese film in Nikkatsu's Roman porno series, directed by Kōyū Ohara and starring Naomi Tani.

Synopsis
Akiko is the heir to a yakuza clan. Hitoshi, who has been kicked out of the rival Hono Clan after attempting to seduce Akiko, kidnaps her at the behest of Hanamura. Hanamura has formed a new gang and intends to use Akiko as a hostage to take over her clan's territory. During the torture and abuse sessions which follow, Akiko comes to enjoy the treatment and forsakes her gangland empire.

Cast
 Naomi Tani: Akiko
 Nami Aoki: Machiko
 Hirokazu Inoue: Saiji
 Hitoshi Takagi: Hitoshi Hanamura
 Kenji Fuji: Gorō

Background
Rope Hell was based on Oniroku Dan's novel . Like much of Oniroku Dan's works, Rope Hell uses the theme of a character who is changed through S&M sessions. At the same time that he was creating such dark torture-fests as Rope Hell, Kōyū Ohara was also directing the bright and upbeat Pink Tush Girl films, which were popular with women as well as men. Ohara had previously worked with Naomi Tani in Fascination: Portrait of a Lady (1977), and had teamed her with her on-screen tormentor in Rope Hell, Hirokazu Inoue in Fairy in a Cage (also 1977). Both of these films had also based on Dan's writings.

Critical appraisal
Allmovie judges Rope Hell to be an inferior film compared to Fairy in a Cage. In their Japanese Cinema Encyclopedia: The Sex Films, the Weissers also write that Rope Hell is not up to the quality of Ohara and Tani's previous work together, but comment positively on Ohara's visuals. The Weissers judge Oniroku Dan's story to be more objectionable than some of his others, with the message that a woman will choose submission and reject self-expression if given the choice, to be clearer than in his other scripts.

Availability
Rope Hell was released theatrically in Japan on June 24, 1978. It was released to home video in VHS format in Japan on February 6, 1998.

Bibliography

English

Japanese

Notes

1978 films
Films directed by Kōyū Ohara
1970s Japanese-language films
Nikkatsu films
Nikkatsu Roman Porno
1970s Japanese films